The 1980–81 Algerian Championnat National was the 19th season of the Algerian Championnat National since its establishment in 1962. A total of 15 teams contested the league, with JE Tizi-Ouzou as the defending champions, The Championnat started on September 5, 1980. and ended on June 12, 1981.

Team summaries

Promotion and relegation 
Teams promoted from Algerian Division 2 1980–1981 
 ISM Aïn Béïda
 USK Alger
 Chlef SO

Teams relegated to Algerian Division 2 1981–1982
 CN Batna
 ESM Guelma

League table

Season statistics

Top scorers

References

External links
1980–81 Algerian Championnat National

Algerian Championnat National
Championnat National
Algerian Ligue Professionnelle 1 seasons